The Kam or Gam language, also known as Dong, is a Kam–Sui language spoken by the Dong people. Ethnologue distinguishes three Kam varieties as separate but closely related languages.

Demographics

Southern Dong
The Southern Dong are the larger of the two Dong language groups in China. Almost 1.5 million speakers of Southern Dong were counted in the 1990 language census, from a total of 2.5 million people in the Dong nationality. The Southern Dong live primarily in the Rongjiang, Jinping, Liping, Zhenyang, and Congjiang counties in Guizhou Province; Longsheng, Sanjiang, and Rongshui counties in northeastern Guangxi; and Tongdao County in Hunan Province. Two villages of Dong are also located in northern Vietnam, although only one individual in Vietnam is still able to speak Dong.

Dialects
The Kam language can be divided into two major subdivisions, Southern Kam and Northern Kam (Yang & Edmondson 2008). Northern Kam displays more Chinese influence and lacks vowel length contrast, while Southern Kam is more conservative. Language varieties closely related to or part of Kam include Cao Miao and Naxi Yao. A northern Pinghua variety called Tongdao Pinghua, spoken in Tongdao County, Hunan, has also been significantly influenced by Kam.

Southern Kam
First lectal area: Róngjiāng Zhānglǔ, Lípíng Hóngzhōu, Jǐnpíng Qǐméng in Guizhou; Tōngdào in Hunan; Longsheng and Sanjiang Dudong in Guangxi
Second lectal area: Lípíng Shuǐkǒu, Cóngjiāng Guàndòng, Róngjiāng Píngjiāng in Guizhou; Sānjiāng Hélǐ in Guangxi
Third lectal area: Zhènyuǎn Bàojīng in Guizhou
Fourth lectal area: Róngshuǐ in Guangxi

Northern Kam
First lectal area: Tiānzhù Shídòng, Sānsuì Kuǎnchǎng, Jiànhé Xiǎoguǎng in Guizhou; also Jǐnpíng Jiǔzhài in Guizhou
Second lectal area: Tiānzhù Zhǔxī in Guizhou
Third lectal area: Jǐnpíng Dàtóng in Guizhou

Long (2012:19-20) classifies the Kam lectal areas (dialects) as follows.

Southern Kam
Lectal area 1
Chejiang, Rongjiang County 
Longcheng, Tongdao County 
Pingdeng, Longsheng County 
Chengyang, Sanjiang County 
Hongzhou, Liping County 
Lectal area 2
Zhaihao, Rongjiang County 
Shuikou, Liping County 
Guidong, Congjiang County 
Heli, Sanjiang County 
Lectal area 3
Zhaihuai, Rongshui County 
Lectal area 4
Pindong, Rongshui County 

Northern Kam
Lectal area 1 (Highland Dong )
Shidong, Tianzhu County 
Kuanchang, Sansui County 
Jiuzhai, Jinping County 
Xiaoguang, Jianhe County 
Lectal area 2 (River Dong )
Datong, Jinping County 
Sanmentang, Tianzhu County 
Lannichong, Jingzhou County 
Lectal area 3
Zhuxi, Tianzhu County 
Zhongzhai, Xinhuang County 
Lectal area 4
Qimeng, Jinping County 
Lectal area 5
Baojing, Zhenyuan County 

In Congjiang County, Dong consists of three dialects: Jiudong   (similar to Chejiang  Dong), Liudong  (similar to Liping  Dong), and another dialect spoken in Xishan , Bingmei , and Guandong  (similar to Sanjiang  Dong) (Congjiang County Gazetteer 1999:109).

In Suining County, Hunan, Dong is spoken in Lianfeng  (including Duolong ), Huangsangping , Le'anpu , and other nearby locations. In Chengbu County, Hunan, Dong is spoken in Yanzhai , Chang'anying , and Jiangtousi .

Kam is also spoken in the single village of Đồng Mộc, Trung Sơn Commune, Yên Sơn District, Tuyên Quang Province, northern Vietnam, where there are about 35 Kam people (Edmondson & Gregerson 2001). The Kam of Đồng Mộc had migrated to Vietnam from China about 150 years ago. The Kam variety spoken in Đồng Mộc is most similar to that of Lípíng Shuǐkǒu in southeastern Guizhou, China.

In China, a total of six counties designated as Dong Autonomous Counties.
Yuping Dong Autonomous County, Guizhou
Sanjiang Dong Autonomous County, Guangxi
Xinhuang Dong Autonomous County, Hunan
Zhijiang Dong Autonomous County, Hunan
Jingzhou Miao and Dong Autonomous County, Hunan
Tongdao Dong Autonomous County, Hunan

Others

According to the Shaoyang Prefecture Gazetteer (1997), language varieties closely related to Southern Kam are spoken in Naxi , Dongkou County (which had 4,280 ethnic Yao in 1982 (Chen 2013:39)) and Lianmin , Suining County. However, they are officially classified by the Chinese government as ethnic Yao, not Dong. Chen Qiguang (2013:39) reports that the ancestors of Naxihua  speakers had migrated to their current location from Tianzhu, Liping, and Yuping counties of southeastern Guizhou during the early 15th century.

Sanqiao 三锹 (三橇) is a mixed Dong–Miao language spoken in Liping County and Jinping County, Guizhou, China by about 6,000 people.

Phonology and orthography

Kam has two main orthographies: The Chinese academic developed system and the independently developed system by Ngo Van Lyong for Southern Kam as spoken in Rongjiang. The Chinese system is most commonly used by linguists and has similarities to other Chinese Kra–Dai language orthographies (Such as Zhuang). The Ngo Van Lyong system was inspired by the Vietnamese alphabet and is made for speakers and learners. While the Chinese system is the most well known, most Kam speakers are not literate.

Initials

The Chinese orthography for Kam orthography has 32 syllable-initial consonants; seven of them (and ) only occur in recent loanwords from Chinese.

The Ngo Van Lyong orthography for Southern Kam has 28 syllable-initial consonants.

Finals
The Chinese orthography for Kam has 64 syllable finals; 14 of them occur only in Chinese loans and are not listed in the table below.

The Ngo Van Lyong orthography for Southern Kam has 116 syllable finals.

Tones
Kam is a tonal language. Open syllables can occur in one of nine different tones, checked syllables in six tones (so-called entering tones), so that the traditional approach counts fifteen tones. As with the Hmong alphabet, the Chinese orthography marks tones with a consonant at the end of each syllable.

The Ngo Van Lyong orthography marks tones via diacritics written above or below the vowel as with the Vietnamese alphabet and only features 6 tones.

References

 Ōu Hēngyuán 欧亨元: Cic deenx Gaeml Gax / Dòng-Hàn cídiǎn 侗汉词典 (Kam–Chinese dictionary; Běijīng 北京, Mínzú chūbǎnshè 民族出版社 2004), .

Further reading
Long, Y., Zheng, G., & Geary, D. N. (1998). The Dong language in Guizhou Province, China. Summer Institute of Linguistics and the University of Texas at Arlington publications in linguistics, publication 126. Dallas, TX: Summer Institute of Linguistics. 
Yang, Tongyin & Edmondson, Jerold A. (2008). Kam. In Anthony V. N. Diller and Jerold A. Edmondson and Yongxian Luo (eds.), The Tai-Kadai Languages, 509-584. London & New York: Routledge.

External links
 Southern Dong word list from the Austronesian Basic Vocabulary Database
 Dong-language Swadesh vocabulary list of basic words (from Wiktionary's Swadesh-list appendix)

Languages of China
Kam–Sui languages